Shut Up, Dude is the first mixtape by American hip hop trio Das Racist. It was released as a free download by Greedhead Music and Mishka on March 29, 2010.

Music videos
A music video was created for "Who's That? Brooown!". The video linked to a playable online game. Pitchfork included it on the "Top Music Videos of 2010" list, while Rolling Stone included it on the "Best Videos of 2010" list. It was selected to screen at the 2011 Sundance Film Festival. A music video was also created for "Rainbow in the Dark".

Critical reception

Nate Patrin of Pitchfork gave the mixtape a 7.8 out of 10, saying, "Das Racist's Brooklyn-buzz affiliations and humorous bent might mislead you into thinking it's an exercise in cheap laffs for people who don't take rap seriously, but this album feels a lot more like the irreverent hip-hop fanboy mania of ego trip magazine than smarmy genre tourism." Chris Molnar of Cokemachineglow wrote: "Maybe the most refreshing thing about Shut Up, Dude is how it sounds completely free of calculation." Sean Fennessey of The Village Voice called it "a deeply self-conscious batch of word-association jumbles, references to other artists' lyrics, and half-hearted hooks."

Stereogum placed the mixtape at number 30 on the "Top 50 Albums of 2010" list.

Track listing

Personnel
Credits adapted from the liner notes.

 Young Paperboy – production (1)
 Sabzi – production (1)
 Le1f – production (3, 9)
 Aries Noise – production (3, 9)
 J-La – production (4, 8, 11, 15)
 Charles & Beck – production (5)
 Gordon Voidwell – production (7)
 Like Magic – production (10); recording, engineering, mixing (3, 4, 10, 15)
 Das Racist – production (10, 12)
 Daniel "Alfred Jenkins" Lynas – production (12); recording, engineering, mixing (1, 2, 5, 6, 7, 8, 9, 11, 12, 13, 14, 16, 17)
 Arturo Klauft – production (13)
 Kassa Overall – production (14)
 Mike Finito – production (17)
 DJA – mastering
 Aakash Nihalani – artwork, photography
 Ryder Fleming-Jones – executive production

References

External links
 
Shut Up, Dude at Archive.org

2010 mixtape albums
Das Racist albums
Greedhead Music albums